International Print Center New York is a non-profit organization dedicated to the appreciation and understanding of fine art prints.  It was founded by Anne Coffin and established in Chelsea, Manhattan, New York City in September 2000 as the only non-profit institution devoted solely to the exhibition and understanding of fine art prints. IPCNY fosters a climate for the enjoyment, examination and serious study of artists' prints from the old master to the contemporary. IPCNY nurtures the growth of new audiences for the visual arts while serving the print community through exhibitions, publications, and educational programs.

In keeping with their mission to promote the greater appreciation and understanding of the fine art print, IPCNY presents a selection of new prints from emerging to established artists, made within the past twelve months, four times per year.

In addition to its New Prints shows, IPCNY organizes two additional exhibitions per season in its gallery in Chelsea, one in the fall and one in the spring. These exhibitions provide context for the New Prints shows, presenting selections of prints from other periods or cultures. The prints are borrowed from public and private collections, and guest curated by experts in the field.

Founded in 1995, IPCNY has exhibited work from emerging artists to international masters, including Ed Ruscha, Kiki Smith and Frank Stella.

References

External links
International Print Center New York

Art museums established in 1995
Printmaking groups and organizations
Art museums and galleries in New York City
Museums in Manhattan
1995 establishments in New York (state)
Chelsea, Manhattan